The 1949 National League Division Three was the third season of British speedway's National League Division Three.

The league expanded to 13 teams from 12. Cradley Heath, Southampton and Coventry had all moved up to Division Two whilst Wombwell dropped out. The five new sides were Halifax Dukes, Liverpool Chads, Leicester Hunters, Rayleigh Rockets and Oxford Cheetahs.

Swindon Robins replaced Hull Angels mid-season and Hanley Potters won the title on race points difference from Yarmouth Bloaters.

Billy Bales of Yarmouth topped the averages.

Final table

+Hull withdrew and were replaced by Swindon.

Leading Averages

National Trophy Stage One
 For Stage Two - see Stage Two
 For Stage Three - see Stage Three

The 1949 Trophy was the 12th edition of the Knockout Cup. The Trophy consisted of three stages; stage one was for the third division clubs, stage two was for the second division clubs and stage three was for the top tier clubs. The winner of stage one would qualify for stage two and the winner of stage two would qualify for the third and final stage. Hanley Potters won stage one and therefore qualified for stage two.

Third Division Qualifying First round

Third Division Qualifying Second round

Third Division Qualifying semifinals

Qualifying final
First leg

Second leg

See also
List of United Kingdom Speedway League Champions
Knockout Cup (speedway)

References

Speedway National League Division Three
Speedway National League Division 3
1949 in speedway